JW's Family Album is the ninth studio album by Australian country music artist John Williamson. The album was released in October 1990 and peaked at number 21 on the ARIA Charts and was certified platinum. It included a re-recording of Williamson's debut single "Old Man Emu", including an additional verse.

At the ARIA Music Awards of 1991, the album was nominated for the ARIA Award for Best Children's Album.

At the Country Music Awards of Australia of 1992, the album won Top Selling Album.

Track listing

Charts

Certifications

Release history

References

1990 albums
John Williamson (singer) albums
Festival Records albums